Spirhapalum is a genus of flatworms belonging to the family Spirorchiidae.

Species:

Spirhapalum elongatum 
Spirhapalum polesianum 
Spirhapalum siamense

References

Platyhelminthes